Oxford House Airport  is located  west of Oxford House, Manitoba, Canada.

Airlines and destinations

References

Certified airports in Manitoba